Yevsey Yevseyevich Moiseyenko (– 29 November 1988) was a Soviet Russian painter. He was a People's Artist of the USSR (1970), full member of the Academy of Arts of the USSR (1973), and Hero of Socialist Labor (1986).

Biography 
Since 1936 Moiseenko lived in Leningrad. He was trained at the Academy of Arts under Alexander Osmerkin and taught at the Academy from 1947, becoming a professor in 1957. Moiseyenko developed the theme of romantic heroism, which can be seen his paintings such as The Reds came, 1961; Comrades, 1964; Sweet Cherries, 1969; all of which are exhibited in the State Russian Museum in St. Petersburg.

In 1974, Moiseyenko was awarded the Lenin Prize. The poetry of the village and city landscapes is demonstrated in Tulsky Lane, Leningrad, 1963, (in the State Russian Museum), while Boys, painted in 1974 and exhibited in the State Tretyakov Gallery, captures the romanticism of youth.

He also painted portraits: portrait of artist A. A. Osmerkin, 1970; portrait of art historian G. V. Kekusheva, 1971, exhibited at the State Russian Museum and still-lives. The series of paintings Memory (1976–80) was awarded the State Prize of the USSR in 1983. During the last years of his life he worked on a series devoted to Alexander Pushkin, to the Poet's Memory, 1985. He lived on 56 Suvorovsky Avenue, where a memorial plaque is located. He was buried at Literatorskie Mostki.

See also
 Mothers, Sisters (Painting of Moiseenko)
 Cherry (Painting of Moiseenko)
 Fine Art of Leningrad
 Leningrad School of Painting
 List of 20th-century Russian painters
 List of painters of Saint Petersburg Union of Artists
 List of Russian artists
 Saint Petersburg Union of Artists

References

Sources 
 Кекушева-Новосадюк Г. В. Евсей Евсеевич Моисеенко. Л., 1977; 
 Леонова Н. Г. Евсей Моисеенко. Л., 1989.

External links 
 Овсепян И. Этюд в невеселых тонах // Советская Белоруссия, No.137 (24520), 23 июля 2014

1916 births
1988 deaths
20th-century Russian painters
Russian male painters
20th-century Ukrainian painters
20th-century Ukrainian male artists
20th-century Russian male artists
Leningrad School artists
Painters from Saint Petersburg
Repin Institute of Arts alumni
Russian people of Ukrainian descent
Ukrainian male painters